Frank or Francis Ward may refer to:

 Frank Ward (cricketer, born 1865) (1865–?), English cricketer
 Frank Ward (cricketer, born 1888) (1888–1952), English cricketer
 Frank Ward (cricketer, born 1906) (1906–1974), Australian cricketer
 Frank Ward (basketball), American basketball player
 Frank Ward (footballer) (1902–1974), English association footballer
 Frank Ward (cyclist), Irish cyclist
 Frank Edwin Ward (1872–1953), American composer and organist
 Francis Ward (British Army officer) (1840–1919), British soldier
 Francis Ward (rugby union) (1900–1990), New Zealand rugby union player
 Francis Marshall Ward (1830–1914), bass singer, composer and musician

See also
 Frances Ward (disambiguation)
 Michael Francis Ward (1845–1881), Irish doctor and politician